The Eurocopter EC135 (now Airbus Helicopters H135) is a twin-engine civil light utility helicopter produced by Airbus Helicopters (formerly known as Eurocopter). It is capable of flight under instrument flight rules (IFR) and is outfitted with a digital automatic flight control system (AFCS). First flying on 15 February 1994, it entered service in 1996 and 1,400 have been delivered up to September 2020 to 300 operators in 60 countries, accumulating over 5 million flight hours. It is mainly used for helicopter emergency medical services, corporate transport, law enforcement, offshore wind support, and military flight training. Half of them are in Europe and a quarter in North America. The H135M, certified under the name Eurocopter EC635, is a military variant.

Development

Origins
The H135 started development prior to the formation of Eurocopter under Messerschmitt-Bölkow-Blohm (MBB) under the designation Bo 108 in the 1970s. MBB developed it in partnership with Aérospatiale, the Bo 108 was initially intended to be a technology demonstrator, combining attributes of the successful MBB Bo 105 with new advances and an aerodynamically streamlined design. Technologies included on the Bo 108 included the first full-authority digital engine controls (FADEC) on a helicopter, a hingeless main rotor, and the adoption of a new transmission. The first prototype made its first flight on 17 October 1988, powered by two Allison 250-C20R/1 engines. A second Bo 108 followed on 5 June 1991, this time with two Turbomeca TM319-1B Arrius engines; unlike later production aircraft, both technology demonstrators flew with conventional tail rotors.

In the late 1990s, the design was revised with the introduction of the Fenestron tail rotor system, an advanced rigid main rotor, composite materials, and resonance isolation systems. It was decided to pursue a full certification program, resulting in the production of two pre-production prototypes; at the same time, it was chosen to give the Bo 108 a new designation of EC135 to correspond with the newly created Eurocopter company. At this point, it was decided that the EC135 should be developed with the option of being powered by two competing engines, the Turbomeca Arrius 2B and the Pratt & Whitney Canada PW206B engines; two pre-production prototypes were built in 1994 powered by either engine, both powerplants proved to be successful and were used on subsequent production aircraft.

In January 1995, the EC135 made its first public appearance at the Heli-Expo convention at Las Vegas, at which prospective buyers were reportedly impressed with its appearance and performance figures. Another feature which became apparent upon entering service was the low noise levels produced, in part due to its fenestron tail, the EC135 was the quietest aircraft in its class for more than 15 years. Despite the helicopter's design being primarily oriented towards emergency medical operators, the EC135 had considerable appeal to a wide range of operators. European JAA certification was achieved on 16 June 1996, with FAA approval following on 31 July.

On 2 December 1999, the EC135 was granted single-pilot IFR (SPIFR) certification by Germany's Luftfahrt-Bundesamt (LBA). In December 2000, the United Kingdom's Civil Aviation Authority also gave the EC135 SPIFR certification.

Further development

In 2000, Eurocopter announced the start of certification work on the EC135P2, powered by the Pratt & Whitney Canada PW206B2, offering improved single-engine performance and 30-second emergency power. The LBA certification was achieved on 10 July 2001, and the first EC135 with the new engines was handed over to the Swedish Police Authority on 10 August 2001. In September 2002, the EC135T2 equipped with the improved Turbomeca Arrius 2B2 was made available, also providing for improved single-engine performance.

In 2002, the EC135 active control technology demonstrator/flying helicopter simulator (ACT/FHS), a research aircraft designed to test fibre optic-based flight control systems, undertook its first flight. In 2014, Airbus Helicopters began flying the Bluecopter demonstrator aircraft, built to explore more efficient design elements, including economy-optimised single-engine operations, Blue Edge swept rotor blades to reduce noise and increase efficiency, a relocated horizontal stabilizer outside the main rotor's downwash, an active rudder, and new water-based external paint; these changes were aimed at cutting fuel consumption by 40%. In December 2014, it was revealed that the single-engine operations portion of the Bluecopter tests had been delayed to summer 2016 to make necessary avionics changes, such as to the engine's FADEC systems.

At the NBAA in March 2007 in Atlanta, Eurocopter unveiled 'L'Hélicoptère par Hermès, a special-edition VIP model designed by Hermès International, S.A.; it features a customized luxury four-place main cabin, a sliding glass partition, a corporate baggage hold, redesigned skid landing gear and other external changes. The launch customer for the type is Falcon Aviation Services (FAS), based in Abu Dhabi, United Arab Emirates. In July 2014, Airbus Helicopters announced that it was making further personalization options available for the EC135 l'Helicoptere par Hermes.

In 2011, Eurocopter formalised a license manufacturing agreement with Zhong-Ou International Group to produce the EC135 luxury helicopter in Zhejiang Province, China. In October 2015, a letter of intent between Airbus Helicopters and Ecopark was signed for the establishment of a final assembly line (FAL) in Qingdao Province, China; a related $1.1 billion order for 100 Chinese-assembled H135s was announced in the same month. The majority of assembly work on the type remains at Airbus Helicopter's Donauwörth facility. Construction of the FAL started in May 2017, and it was opened for production on 17 April 2019.

In January 2016, it was announced that the Ural Works of Civil Aviation (UWCA), a division of Rostec, had signed an agreement to build the H135 under licence at the firm's facility in Yekaterinburg, Russia. In May 2016, it was reported that Russian production of the H135 was anticipated to begin in 2017, following the receipt of Russian type certification; in addition, Russian manufacturers may be incorporated in the global supply chain.

Two variants, the EC135 T3 and EC135 P3, were developed with improved high altitude and hover performance. Changes include repositioned air intakes to the engines, wider blades being installed on the main rotor, and changes to the fenstron anti-torque tail device. The EC135 T3 was introduced to service in December 2014.

In December 2020, the H135 helicopter family EASA has certified a new Alternate Gross Weight (AGW). With the new AGW, the maximum takeoff weight has been increased up to 265 lb (120 kg) and payload. This modification can also be used to increase range by up to 75 nm or endurance by up to 40 minutes under standard conditions. The new AGW is available as an option and can be applied retroactively to all Helionix-equipped H135s.

Airbus certified a new single-pilot IFR Helionix cockpit for its H135 helicopters in December 2020. The modified cockpit allows customers to choose whether to remove the copilot side of the instrument panel to increase the field of view or keep it to install specific STC equipment.

Design

The H135 is a twin-engine rotorcraft. It can be alternatively powered by a pair of Turbomeca Arrius 2B or Pratt & Whitney Canada PW206B engines, dependent on customer's preference (which gives either a T or a P, respectively, in the variant name). The main rotor is of a four-bladed, hingeless fiber-composite design; progressive improvements to the main rotor have increased its performance and reduced maintenance costs since the type's introduction. The EC135 holds the distinction of being the quietest helicopter in its class, featuring an anti-resonance isolation system to dampen vibration from the main rotor. The type's fenestron anti-torque device can be actively regulated via a HI NR rotor optimization mode, which provides for greater controllability during higher weight take-off and landings. It is capable of performing Category A operations throughout its full flight envelope.

The EC135 can be equipped with either a conventional flight deck or the Avionique Novelle glass cockpit – the latter allows for single pilot instrument flight rules operation. The glass cockpit is equipped with several liquid-crystal displays, including two Sextant SMD45 displays and a central panel display. The main avionics suite is supplied by Thales Group; the EC135 can be outfitted with various avionics suites from manufacturers such as Russian firm Transas Aviation and British firm Britannia 2000.

The newer H135 model can be equipped with a four-axis autopilot, which is included as part of the Helionix avionics suite; this suite provides the H135 a greater level of commonality with several other Airbus Helicopters-produced rotorcraft including the H145, H160 and H175. Earlier versions of the EC135 were equipped with a three-axis autopilot with integrated stability augmentation; featuring a First Limit Indicator (FLI), simplifying engine and torque monitoring. Cockpit touch screens can be optionally installed.

Various cabin and cockpit configurations are available for the EC135, depending on the role performed and the operator's preferences. It can hold up to five passengers and a pilot when configured with a standard executive interior, or seven passengers in a dense corporate interior. Modular multi-role interiors that allow the main cabin area to be quickly changed and re-equipped are also available. The main cabin of the EC135 is accessed either by large doors on either side of the cabin or by clamshell doors located at the rear of the cabin, directly underneath the aircraft's tail boom; the clamshell doors are particularly attractive to emergency medical services (EMS) and cargo operators. Various medical facilities can be installed in the cabin, such as in-flight intensive care stations (including resuscitation functionality), incubators, and hygiene-convenient flooring. In a mountain rescue configuration, the cabin can simultaneously accommodate two stretchers as well as the pilot, anaesthetist, winch operator, mechanic and mountain rescue specialist.

Airbus Helicopters has promoted the airframe's various configurations as possessing "unique adaptability" for various missions, including utility work, commercial transportation, and training roles. Equipment for the law enforcement role include external loudspeakers, rappelling system, search lights with laser pointers, left or right-mounted hoists, and electro-optical sensors. For offshore oil & gas operations, the rotorcraft can be fitted with weather/search radars, emergency floatation aids (including an automated external life raft), energy-absorbent seating, class-D certified external hoists, and crash-resistant fuel tanks. An external hook can be installed to carry underslung loads of up to 272 kg for cargo missions. In a training capacity, features such a light aircraft recording system (for post-flight analysis), intuitive human-machine interface, specific training modules, and a one-engine inoperative training mode, and full ground simulators, may be selected.

Operational history

Deliveries started on 1 August 1996, when two helicopters (0005 and 0006) were handed over to German emergency aero medical service provider Deutsche Rettungsflugwacht. The 100th EC135 was handed over to the Bavarian police force in June 1999; by which point the worldwide fleet had accumulated approximately 30,000 flight hours. In September 2003, the 300th EC135 was handed over to UK-based McAlpine Helicopters; at this point, the EC135 was the best selling new light twin-engine helicopter in the UK market.

In 2011, Eurocopter announced that the 1,000th EC135 to be produced had been delivered to German operator ADAC, roughly 15 years following the start of production. In 2012, Flying magazine recognised the EC135 as being "the industry's best selling twin-engine helicopter". The world fleet leader in flight hours for the type is G-NESV (s/n 0067), operated by Cleveland Police Air Operations Unit based at Durham Tees Valley Airport, UK. Originally delivered to the North East Air Support Unit in April 1999, it was the first EC135 worldwide to attain a total of 10,000 flying hours.

In 2009, the EC135 was the first aircraft selected for offshore wind support in the UK after the Civil Aviation Authority approved helicopter operations to the Greater Gabbard offshore wind farm. The EC135 has also been used in Denmark to support the Horns Rev offshore wind farm, by 2013, over 10,000 successful personnel transfers have taken place using the type. In Mexico, Apoyo Logístico Aéreo has operated a fleet of EC135s for servicing the extensive oil and gas offshore platforms in the Gulf of Mexico.

In 2013, it was reported that the EC135 was currently providing roughly 25% of the world's total emergency medic services flights, and that over 500 EC135s have been delivered to in an aeromedical configuration. By late 2013, during which a brief grounding of the type was instigated due to safety concerns of fuel gauges, it was noted that the EC135 made up half of the UK's operational air ambulance fleet. In October 2014, the first EC135 air ambulance to be delivered in the Chinese market took place.

The German Army operates a total of 19 H135s as basic trainers at the School of Army Aviation in Bückeburg, these have had an average operational availability in excess of 95 per cent; in 2014, the German Army noted that there was potential for vibration-induced rotor cracking during autorotation training, shortening the life of the main rotor. In October 2014, the Australian Department of Defence announced that the EC135 would be procured as the primary training platform for both the Australian Army and Royal Australian Navy. A total of 13 EC135 trainers have been procured by the Japanese Maritime Self-Defense Force, they have been designed as the TH-135.

In December 2014, the first production EC135 T3 formally entered service with Aiut Alpin Dolomites, a mountain rescue operator based in Italy. In June 2015, Airbus Helicopters delivered the first retrofitted H135 from the earlier EC135 standard; changes include an enlarged main rotor, relocated engine air intakes, elevated engine performance, and the horizontal stabiliser's endplates removed and its span increased.

In October 2015, Waypoint Leasing and Airbus Helicopters signed an agreement for the acquisition of up to 20 H135 for public leasing purposes.

Variants

EC135 P1 Powered by two 463 kW (621 shp) Pratt & Whitney Canada PW206B (ratings correspond to take-off power (TOP)). Later versions have the centre panel display system (CPDS). Initial maximum take-off weight (M.T.O.W.) of 2,630 kg (5,798 lbs), later raised to 2,720 kg (5,997 lbs) and then 2,835 kg (6,250 lbs).
EC135 T1 Powered by two 435 kW (583 shp)(TOP rating) Turbomeca Arrius 2B1/2B1A/2B1A1. Later versions have the CPDS. Initial M.T.O.W. of 2,630 kg (5,798 lbs), later raised to 2,720 kg (5,997 lbs) and then 2,835 kg (6,250 lbs).
EC135 P2 Powered by two 463 kW (621 shp) (TOP rating) Pratt & Whitney Canada PW206B2. Increased thermodynamic and mechanic OEI ratings (128% OEI torque). Replaced EC135 P1 in production in August 2001.
EC135 T2 Powered by two 452 kW (606 shp) (TOP rating) Turbomeca Arrius 2B2. Increased thermodynamic and mechanic OEI ratings (128% OEI torque). Replaced EC135 T1 in production in August 2002.
EC135 P2+ (Marketing name EC135 P2i)Latest current production version with 498 kW (667 shp) PW206B2 (new power ratings based on a FADEC software upgrade), plus a 2,910 kg (6,415 lbs) M.T.O.W. upgrade, extended component time between overhauls (TBOs), and a change in the main transmission lubricating oil. Built in Germany and Spain.
EC135 T2+ (Marketing name EC135 T2i)Latest current production version with 473 kW (634 shp) Arrius 2B2 engines (new power ratings based on a FADEC software upgrade), plus a 2,910 kg (6,415 lbs) M.T.O.W. upgrade, extended component TBOs, and a change in the main transmission lubricating oil. Built in Germany and Spain.
EC135 P2+ (Marketing name EC135 P2e)Marketing designation of aircraft with increased M.T.O.W. of 2,950 kg (6,504 lbs) within restricted flight envelope.
EC135 T2+ (Marketing name EC135 T2e) Marketing designation of aircraft with increased M.T.O.W. of 2,950 kg (6,504 lbs) within restricted flight envelope.
EC135 P3 Powered by two 528 kW (708 shp) (TOP rating) PW206B3 engines (new power ratings based on a FADEC software upgrade), plus a 2,980 kg (6,570 lbs) M.T.O.W. upgrade, and significant increased OEI, Cat A, and hot/high performance. Market introduction in 2014.
H135 (EC135 T3)Powered by two 492 kW (660 shp) (TOP rating) Arrius 2B2Plus engines (new power ratings based on a FADEC software upgrade), plus a 2,980 kg (6,570 lbs) M.T.O.W. upgrade, and significant increased OEI, Cat A, and hot/high performance. Market introduction in 2014.
EC635/H135M Military variant originally developed to meet a Portuguese Army requirement for a fire support and medical evacuation helicopter. Presently, operated by Jordan, Swiss and Iraqi armed forces.
TH-135  Military training variant developed from the EC135 T2+.
ACH135  Corporate variant of the H135.

Operators

In 2016, half of the EC135s operating in service were engaged in emergency medical services operations, 17% in air transport, 16% in public services (typically law enforcement), 10% in military missions, 4% in offshore operations (typically offshore wind power inspection), and the remaining 3% in military training.

The 1400th was delivered in September 2020, as over 300 customers in 60 countries accumulated more than 4.5 million flight hours.
Most are in Europe (641), followed by North America (316) and Asia (195).

Military operators

 Royal Australian Navy

Brazilian Air Force
Brazilian Navy - 3 EC135 T3 ordered to replace AS355F2.

Gabonese Air Force

German Army

 Irish Air Corps

 Japan Maritime Self-Defense Force

Royal Moroccan Air Force - H135s ordered for training duties in 2022. 
Royal Moroccan Gendarmerie

 Nigerian Air Force

Spanish Army Airmobile Force

Royal Air Force/Ascent Flight Training - No. 1 Flying Training School
British Army -  Army Air Corps (pending replacement of Gazelle AH-1 in 2024)

Government operators

Argentine Federal Police
Argentine National Gendarmerie

New South Wales Police AirWing

Federal Police

Ontario Provincial Police

Croatian Police

 State Police

Federal Police
State Police

HSE National Ambulance Service

Garda Air Support Unit

Japanese National Police

State Border Guard

National Police
ANWB Medical Air Assistance

Norwegian Police Service

Air ambulances in Poland
 Border Guard (Poland)

Romanian Police 
SMURD 

Slovenian National Police

Civil Guard
National Police Corps

Northern Lighthouse Board
National Police Air Service (England & Wales)
Police Scotland
Police Service of Northern Ireland
Trinity House

Ministry of Health (Turkey) (operated by Turkish Aeronautical Association) 

Broward County Sheriff
Massachusetts State Police
NASA
Kennedy Space Center

Accidents and incidents
On 29 November 2013, a Police Scotland EC135 T2 crashed into a pub in Glasgow, Scotland. Three occupants of the aircraft were killed, as well as seven patrons of the pub. The UK AAIB issued its final report on the accident on 23 October 2015. It said that "No significant pre-impact technical defect was identified in any part of the aircraft or its systems." It added that important fuel transfer pumps were switched off "for unknown reasons", and also that the helicopter "did not land within the 10-minute period specified in the Pilot’s Checklist Emergency and Malfunction Procedures, following continuous activation of the low fuel warnings, for unknown reasons."

Specifications (EC135 P2+/T2+)

See also

References

External links

 
 
 
 

Airbus Helicopters aircraft
1990s German civil utility aircraft
1990s German helicopters
Fantail helicopters
Twin-turbine helicopters
Aircraft first flown in 1994